Laetitia Zonzambé is widely regarded in Central African Republic as the top pop music star in the country.  Her progress has been made possible to a good extent by the support of Alliance Française and the United Nations Development Programme.

Her songs and music, based on traditional African elements with European and Caribbean influences, has attracted the attention of fans both in Africa and abroad, mainly among Africans in France.

References

Living people
Central African Republic musicians
Year of birth missing (living people)
Central African Republic women